Henry Joseph Smith (July 14, 1883 – February 26, 1961), was a Major League Baseball outfielder.

Smith was born in Coquille, Oregon. He died in San Jose, California.

External links

1883 births
1961 deaths
Major League Baseball outfielders
Brooklyn Superbas players
Baseball players from Oregon
San Jose Prune Pickers players
Oakland Commuters players
Montgomery Billikens players
Montgomery Rebels players
People from Coquille, Oregon